The William Hemmelberg House is a historic stone farmhouse in Elba Township, Minnesota, United States.  The original section was built around 1858 and the house was doubled in size with a circa-1870 addition.  The house was listed on the National Register of Historic Places in 1986 for its local significance in the theme of exploration/settlement.  It was nominated for being a rare surviving vestige of the Whitewater Valley's early pioneers.

See also
 National Register of Historic Places listings in Winona County, Minnesota

References

1858 establishments in Minnesota
Houses completed in 1858
Houses completed in 1870
Houses in Winona County, Minnesota
Houses on the National Register of Historic Places in Minnesota
National Register of Historic Places in Winona County, Minnesota